Stavchany is a village in Lviv Raion, Lviv Oblast, Ukraine. It belongs to Pustomyty urban hromada, one of the hromadas of Ukraine.

Until 18 July 2020, Stavchany belonged to Pustomyty Raion. The raion was abolished in July 2020 as part of the administrative reform of Ukraine, which reduced the number of raions of Lviv Oblast to seven.

References

Villages in Lviv Raion